Éva Tófalvi (born December 4, 1978) is a retired Romanian biathlete of Hungarian ethnicity.

Career
She finished in 11th place in the Women's Overall World Cup standings and in 2nd place in the Individual event at the end of the 2008-09 Biathlon World Cup. During this season she also won her first ever World Cup event in Hochfilzen, Austria, in the 15 km Individual race, she originally finished second, but winner Albina Akhatova was later disqualified due to use of doping. Tofalvi's victory is also the first ever race won by a Romanian athlete in the biathlon World Cup.

Results 
Results in top 30 are included.

Notes and references

External links 
 Romanian Ski and Biathlon Federation
 
 

1978 births
Living people
Romanian female biathletes
Olympic biathletes of Romania
Biathletes at the 1998 Winter Olympics
Biathletes at the 2002 Winter Olympics
Biathletes at the 2006 Winter Olympics
Biathletes at the 2010 Winter Olympics
Biathletes at the 2014 Winter Olympics
Biathletes at the 2018 Winter Olympics
Sportspeople from Miercurea Ciuc
Romanian sportspeople of Hungarian descent
Székely people
Doping cases in biathlon
Romanian sportspeople in doping cases